Sir Benjamin Smith (29 January 1879 – 5 May 1964) was a Labour Party politician in England.

A driver of one of London's first taxicabs, Smith became the first organiser for the London Cab Drivers' Union. He was national organiser of the Transport and General Workers' Union from its formation in 1922 until he was elected to Parliament in 1923. He was sworn in as a member of His Majesty's Most Honourable Privy Council in 1943. This gave him the honorific title "The Right Honourable" for life.

Smith was member of Parliament (MP) for Rotherhithe from 1923 until 1931 and from 1935 until 1946. He served as Minister of Food in the 1945 Attlee ministry until his resignation in May 1946 to become chairman of West Midlands Coal Board.

References

External links
"The New Cabinet". Time. 13 August 1945.
"Sir Ben's Battle". Time. 18 February 1946.

 

1879 births
1964 deaths
English trade unionists
Knights Bachelor
Labour Party (UK) MPs for English constituencies
Members of the Privy Council of the United Kingdom
Ministers in the Attlee governments, 1945–1951
Ministers in the Churchill wartime government, 1940–1945
Politics of the London Borough of Southwark
Transport and General Workers' Union-sponsored MPs
Treasurers of the Household
UK MPs 1923–1924
UK MPs 1924–1929
UK MPs 1929–1931
UK MPs 1935–1945
UK MPs 1945–1950